Dialdirect is a South African insurance company. It is one of the short-term insurance companies that form Telesure Investment Holdings (TIH). Dialdirect was established in 2003 in South Africa originated from Dial Direct in the UK.

Awards 

 2008: Top Short-Term Insurance Brand in the Sunday Times Ipsos Markinor Top Brands Survey
 2015: Bronze trophy at the Cannes Lions Awards for the Notebook TV commercial
 2015: Most improved SA brand at the Orange index Service awards
 2019: Product of the Year. Winner – Services Category. Survey of 4000 households by Nielsen

References

Insurance companies of South Africa